KRAN (103.3 FM) is a radio station licensed to Warren AFB, Wyoming, United States. The station is currently owned by Freisland Broadcasting Corp.

History
The station was first assigned the call sign KHNA on September 12, 2006.  On March 23, 2009, White Park Broadcasting swapped call signs with KRAN, which had a construction permit for 97.7 FM in Wamsutter, Wyoming.

References

External links

RAN
Classic country radio stations in the United States